The Dandenong Bypass is a highway in the state of Victoria, Australia that runs along the Dingley Freeway reservation from Springvale Road in Keysborough to the South Gippsland Highway in Dandenong South.

History
The Dandenong Bypass was completed along the alignment reserved for the Dingley Freeway corridor, staged in two separate projects over seven years. The entire bypass has a speed limit of 80 km/h with traffic light controlled intersections and overpasses at Cheltenham Road and EastLink.

Dandenong Bypass was signed as Metropolitan Route 49 between Springvale Road and Eastlink through Keysborough, when the second stage of the bypass was opened in 2012.

The passing of the Road Management Act 2004 granted the responsibility of overall management and development of Victoria's major arterial roads to VicRoads: in 2007, VicRoads re-declared Dandenong Bypass (Arterial #6420) from Perry Road in Keysborough to South Gippsland Highway in Dandenong South; the declaration has since been extended to cover Stage 2 of the bypass terminating at Springvale Road in Keysborough.

Stage 1: Perry Road to South Gippsland Highway
The first stage of the bypass commenced construction in late 2005 between Perry Road and South Gippsland Highway as part of the EastLink project, with the $65 million works involving the creation of a four lane divided road with traffic light controlled access at roads which run north-south along the constructed route.

The 4.8 km bypass also included an overpass of the Cranbourne railway line as well as a diamond interchange with EastLink. The entire bypass has an 80 km/h speed limit. The project was completed and opened to traffic on 9 December 2007.

Stage 2: Springvale Road to Perry Road
The second stage of the bypass commenced construction in 2011 between Springvale Road and Perry Road, connecting the existing Dandenong Bypass at Perry Road with Westall Road and creating an arterial-standard highway, with traffic light controlled intersections and an overpass at Cheltenham Road, for 11 km from Heatherton Road in Springvale to the South Gippsland Highway.

The new section of road was expected to carry between 30,000 and 40,000 vehicles per day, and also included a shared path being constructed alongside, linking to existing shared paths along the previously-built section of the arterial. The construction of this section (at a cost of $74.6 million) was brought forward to commence in 2010 as part of the "Nation Building" initiatives in the 2009 Victorian State Budget. The project was completed early and under budget (previously estimated to cost $80 million) to traffic on 20 December 2012.

Intersections
Dandenong Bypass is entirely contained within the City of Greater Dandenong local government area.

See also

 Highways in Australia
 Highways in Victoria

References

Transport in the City of Greater Dandenong
Dandenong, Victoria
Bypasses in Australia